Blue Force Gear, Inc. is a United States manufacturer of Modular Lightweight Load-carrying Equipment (MOLLE) gear, firearm slings, and other tactical equipment that was established in Pooler, Georgia during January 2004. They design and manufacture equipment for law enforcement, U.S. Armed Forces (and NATO Forces), and Sport Shooters. Select equipment manufactured contains a National Stock Number (NSN) and a National Item Identification Number (NIIN) for supplying armed forces. Its name, Blue Force Gear, is derived from military symbology dating back to World War I: blue being for Allied forces and red for enemy forces.

They are most known for their firearm sling, the Vickers Sling.

Background 

On May 1, 2012 the Vickers Combat Application Sling was assigned NSN: 1005-01-604-0627. Combat trials led by U.S. Marines validated the issue of the NSN in combat trials in Afghanistan (2011) for their new M27 Infantry Rifle. The sling was fully authorized for use on the M4, M4A1 and M16 series of rifles by the United States Marine Corps. The sling then joins over 100,000 other Blue Force Gear slings already issued across the United States Armed Forces.

Vickers Sling name 

The Vickers Sling, a firearm sling, is named after Larry Vickers. Larry Vickers, a retired US Army 1st SFOD-Delta (Delta Force) combat veteran, took part in the United States invasion of Panama and participated in Operation Acid Gambit, a mission to extract a CIA operative, Kurt Muse, from Modelo Prison in Panama City, Panama. Blue Force Gear and Larry Vickers both originally designed the Vickers Sling product line, the Vickers Combat Application Sling (VCAS).

References

External links 
 Blue Force Gear, Inc official website

Manufacturing in the United States
Military technology
Firearm manufacturers of the United States